Bijan Jazani (9 January 1938, Tehran – April 19, 1975) was an Iranian political activist and a major figure among modern Iranian Socialist intellectuals, a Marxist theorist as well as one of the founders of the Organization of Iranian People's Fedai Guerrillas.

Personal and Political Life
Bijan Jazani was born to Hossien Jazani (حسین جزنی) and Alamtaj Kalantari Nazari (عالمتاج کلانتری نظری). His parents' families, separately, began participating in the Tudeh Party during a period of political freedom that started from the exile of Reza Shah until the overthrow of Mohammed Mossadegh. The children of these two families became attracted to and then joined the Tudeh youth party. Their activities at the party grew and they later gained important responsibilities. His father, a military officer, joined the Tudeh party in 1945. His mother, Alamtaj Kalantari, was a member of the Women's Tudeh party.

In 1947, when Bijan Jazani was 9 years old, his father joined the Azerbaijani Democrat Party and in the same year, with the fall of Pishevari, his father left for the Soviet Union and remained there until 1967. It was for this reason that Alamtaj Kalantari took Bijan Jazani and his sisters to her parents' home.

This period had a major impact in the future political life of Jazani. He lived in a household whose members had a professional role in the Tudeh party. During this time, his mother expanded her activities in the women's Tudeh party and Jazani alongside his uncle, who was 2 years older than he was, joined the Tudeh Youth Organization in 1948, at the age of 10. After the Tudeh party became illegal on February 4, 1949, Jazani continued participation in the youth party. He was then chosen as the messenger of the youth organization because of his young age and his family background. But the hidden activities of the Tudeh party and the affiliated organizations did not last long and from 1951, the activities slowly became semi-transparent. In addition to this, the leaders of the Tudeh and the youth organization created the "Iranians in favor of Peace", "National Organization in the Struggle against the Anglo-Iranian Oil Corporation", "Democratic Youth Organizations", and the "Student Organization of Tehran". Jazani began his activities in the "Student Organization of Tehran" in 1951–1952 and was initially responsible for a small group. In 1953 he became semi-responsible for this organization. He was also active in the circulation and sale of student newspapers and began a gym in 1951, which helped students and developed into a place for recruiting members into the youth organization.

These activities continued—except in a short two-month period with the death of his sister Manijeh (منیژه)—until the coup d'état of August 19, 1953 (٢٨ مرداد سال ١٣٣٢). Jazani was arrested in December 1953 because of his political activities, but gave the name Hossien Mahmoodi (حسین محمودی) to the court and after 3 months in prison at a military court, was released under bond. He continued his political activities but was arrested in May 1954 at an organization gathering—disguised under a wedding ceremony—and again gave a false name and was released under bond. In the fall of the same year, he was summoned in relation with the incident of December 1953 and served a 6-month prison term.

After release from prison, he focused on family while keeping true to his political views. He wasn't allowed back to high school so he joined the art school of Kamal-ol-Molk. He created the Persepolis Advertising Company (کانون اگهی پرسپولیس) with the help of a friend. The company advertised in the form of paintings for local merchants. Jazani drew the paintings and the business side was left to his friend. The success of the company led to the creation of the Nabl Film Institution (موسسه نبلی فیلم) in the late 1950s. The company developed TV advertising in Iran and gave financial stability to Jazani.

In 1959, with his company making enough money, he went back to his studies and received his diploma. The following year he signed up for the philosophy program at the University of Tehran. At this time, after eight years of close friendship with his childhood friend and member of the youth organization, Mihan Ghoreishy (میهن قریشی), he married her on October 13, 1960. The result of the marriage were two sons, Babak (بابک) and Mazyar—alias Maximilien (مازیار).

From the years 1956 until 1959, Jazani had no political activities. His wife in this matter wrote: in these years "We had no thoughts of a political future, we relied on our love and in the advancement of our studies. We spent most of our free time reading and at the theaters". In 1959, he returned to politics and created a magazine named Nedaye Khalgh (ندای خلق) with the goal of uniting the politic groups against the coup d'état regime. In the winter of 1959, because of the tight political climate the circulation of the magazine was halted.

Activity in an open Political Climate
When Jazani entered the University of Tehran, the country was facing political and economical problems that led to a retreat for the Shah. These problems were caused by the inabilities of the Shah's economic policies and the extreme military expenses begun after the Coup d'état in 1953. In the spring of 1960 due to mounting debt and inflation the government of Iran requested immediate financial assistance from the World Bank and the government of the United States. The World Bank demanded the Iranian government to fix budget problems, reduce salaries, and balance certain economical plans in order to receive 35 million dollars of assistance. The administration of John F. Kennedy also demanded political and economical reform in the Shah's government for 85 million dollar assistance. Economical problems and external pressure to perform the reforms, led to instability of the regime. The Shah in order to deal with this problem announced the elections of the 20th majlis would be free to all organizations. Although this promise did not come to reality, it showed the retreat of the regime and the opening of a political climate in Iran. The leaders of the Iranian National Front (جبهه ملی ایران) officially announced the existence of the second national front movement and began their activities.

Jazani and his followers slowly moved from the Tudeh party to the student and national front organizations because of their interest in the guerrilla movement in Latin America. Jazani began participating in the student movement at the University of Tehran. The following three reasons are what made him a leader in the student movement:

1. His organizational and leadership experience in street protests that he had gained in the years 1953–1956. These skills would assist him in student protests.

2. Jazani made quick decisions that he would stand by even though he always put time in understanding the situation but only enough to not slow down the movement.

3. Because of an extensive connection he always had good information and because of his superior experience compared to the people around him, he was always calm.

Payam Daneshjoo (نشریه پیام دانشجو)
In early fall of 1963 Jebhe Melli Daneshjoo (سازمان دانشجویان جبهه ملی ایران), which after the resistance in Baharestan Ave., had lost hope to the politics of "patience and hope"; with the help of officials and leaders of the National Front (Iran) (جبهه ملی ایران) selected a new leader for this movement. This led to the creation of the third national movement in the year 1965 and the publication Payam Daneshjoo (نشریه پیام دانشجو) in the fall of 1963—originally published under Jebhe Melli Daneshjoo. Jazani had a major role in this process; Payam Daneshjoo reflected a united movement in the political struggle for students in Iran.

Up to March 1964, Hassan Habiby was editor and responsible for collecting information, articles, and news; while Jazani was in charge of the publication process. In the spring of 1964 a committee was selected to run the publication made up of all factions of the student movement. Hooshang Keshavarz Sadr, Matin Daftari, Majeed Ahsan, and Mansoor Soroush were part of this committee. Jazani was in charge of publication and Behzad Nabavi (بهزاد نبوی) was responsible for circulation. The preliminary work related to the print was done by Jazani at his home. The printing was done on a hand made copy machine that was not only labor-intensive, it also demanded a safe environment from the authorities. Jazani had rented a hidden house for this purpose and in all stages of the process from financial to print had a major role.

By the spring of 1965, roughly 500 copies were published where a number of them were spread by Bahmanpour Shareaty to officials of different universities in the Tehran province and others circulated by Matin Daftari and Dariush Forouhar in non-university related locations. In this period almost all of the process, from writing articles up to publication was done by leftist student movements (Jazani's group, Tudeh (توده), loyalists of Maleki, and loyalists of Shoaeeyan). Jazani wrote several articles explaining the ideology of his movement in the publication. The activities of the third national movement had increasingly worried SAVAK (ساواک). On May 22, 1965, Savak arrested Mostafa Mallad and Bahmanpour Shareaty. In the afternoon of that same day they arrested Jazani and a number of organizers of the student movement such as Majeed Ahsan, Shireen Sour Esrafeel, Manoochehr Taghavee. These arrests signaled the end of a political freedom in Iran under the Shah's regime, resulting in the end of the third national movement in 1965. It seems that SAVAK was unaware of the role of Jazani in the publication of Payam Daneshjoo since the arrest was on charges related to participation in circulation of the publication. The main reason for this mistake by SAVAK was Jazani's concealed presence in the publication. After his arrest some of his friends such as Iraj Vahedeepour in order to show that Jazani had no role in the publication, continued the publication for a couple issues after his arrest. Even so, Jazani and other student activists remained in prison until February 1966 where the court ruled a 9-month sentence but was immediately released given that he had already served his time in prison.

After prison, Jazani continued his studies and in 1966 graduated with a doctorate degree in philosophy from the University of Tehran.

Guerrilla Movement
Jazani, after release from prison with all his power began the development and organization of his movement. In spring of 1966, Hassan Zia-Zarifi was added to group and with his recommendation united the organization with the Razm Avaran organization. Razm Avaran was organized by Abbass Sourky in 1959 and its members in the years before 1953 were members of the Tudeh party and until February 15, 1960, when for promotion and circulation of the party in universities were arrested supported the ideologies of the Tudeh party. But in 1964, when Sourky again organized Razm Avaran, not only did he not want to associate with the Tudeh party but supported the ideology of the Communist Party of China. The recommendation of Hassan Zia-Zarifi, due to the characteristics of Sourky such as inexperience, crowded work, and his past affiliations that led to him being arrested, caused the central authority of the group to be uninterested with this prospect. But, due to internal problems such as impatience of members of the long process of development, which showed when Keyoumars Ezadi left the group, led to the decision to negotiations between the two groups. Even though in the negotiations between Jazani, Zarifi, and Saeed Kalantari Nazari by Sourky and Zarar Zahedian there were major uncertainty to Sourky had been developed by Jazani; the prospect of adding 120 ready members and a large number of explosives and artillery finally led to the merger of the Razm Avaran group with the Jazani group in fall 1966.

There were major problems with this merger. The 120 ready members did not take the organization seriously and were spread from the central group. From the members of Razm Avaran only Sourky and Zahedian met the regulations that would allow members to join the military wing and the central authority. The others became part of the reserve units of the group. One of these members was Naser Aghayan who from 1963 participated with the SAVAK and gave details of Razm Avaran's plan and members. After the merger between the two groups, Aghayan gave reports of the activities of Jazani's group to SAVAK.

Ideology of Jazani's Group
Jazani in respect to the group's views writes: "The experience of group members in Marxist-Leninist activities previous to joining the group led to it being known as followers of the Marxist-Leninist ideology without any discussion". But they were different from other organizations of their time such as Tudeh, Jebheh Engelabi, etc. in this ideology. What was important for Jazani and his followers was to have an independent understanding of Marxism-Leninism without influence from China and the Soviet Union. Therefore, their key goal and what shaped their views was to do what benefited the people of Iran. For example, their position on the Soviet Union, which called itself the leader of the world communist movement, was based on this viewpoint. They began with the idea that the foreign policy of a country is a result of the social values of its regime. This policy reflects the benefits of the leadership level (consisting of a class system) and reflects the ideology of the ruling class. Therefore, a socialist government must be loyal to the goals of Marxist-Leninist and international pluralism. In this setting, they came up to the following conclusion in regard to the relationship of the Soviet Union and Iran: "In our opinion the policies of the Soviet Union and other socialist countries in Iran opposes the growth and revolutionary struggle Asian countries against Imperialism and is in conflict with the chief idea of international pluralism and socialist diplomacy."

It was in this vision that Jazani explained in the relationship of the group and the Soviet Union: "The group had many reasons to not be happy with the idea of Soviet Union being the leader of the world revolutionary movements. The Soviet Unions policies in Iran in the past twenty years and the few years of bad relationship between the Soviet Union and the Tudeh party were known to the members of the group." It was because of this that Jazani came to the conclusion when seeing the relationship of the Soviet Union and Tudeh and Eastern Europe at the end of the decade of 1950 that: "... if the left movement wins the struggle in Iran, it must be aware of the Soviet Union's wanting of power. Failing to do so will lead to Iran becoming another satellite of the Soviets." Jazani said that if the power of the leftist movement falls in the hands of the Soviets, before anything else it will get rid of us. He believed that geographically Iran is too close to the Soviet Union to ignorantly come close to it without understanding the harms involved.

In the evaluation of other organizations in Iran, Jazani before discussing the organizations ideology, it would study its role in the benefit of the people of Iran. For example, in response to the blunders of the Tudeh party, which he once was a member, he gave the following conclusion:

 Inability to understand the objective of internationalism and formation of mistaken relationships with the Soviet government and the Soviet Communist Party from the beginning to the end.
 Being unaware of Iran's society, history, and not paying attention to the struggle against imperialism that caused the Tudeh party to lag behind from other nationalistic freedom movements.
 Positioning itself against Mohammed Mossadegh (Persian: محمد مصدق) and the National Front (Iran) (جبهه ملی ایران)
 Weakness and second guessing in the Coup d'ètat of August 19, 1953 (٢٨ مرداد سال ١٣٣٢) that resulted in the strategic loss of the Tudeh party and the labor movement
 The continuation of the weakness of the rest of the Tudeh party inside and outside of the country resulting in the disunity the labor movement

There is not much information regarding Jazani and his group's early views towards the Iranian community. The earliest information regarding Jazani is in 1963 where he announced that the ruthlessness of the Shah is from feudalism and the efforts that have been taken to fix this issue did not have any positive impact. Therefore, the revolutionary forces of Iran are the farmers whose responsibility is to begin a war from the village's that would result in a popular revolution. But in the fall of 1966, Jazani and the members of the group changed this viewpoint, which was reflected in an article titled "The Iranian anti-tyrannical movement, freedom fighters, and the communists' duty in the current situation." They came to the conclusion that after the Coup d'ètat of August 19, 1953 (٢٨ مرداد) capitalism in Iran grew and began to shape the policy of the government. Its members, who were mostly pro-American, began to have a bigger and wider role in the government of Iran. Since feudalism was a hurdle in the growth of capitalism in Iran they began to demand land, political, and social reform. This was in parallel with the requests of reform in Iran by America, but the Shah and the ruling government, who were protected by England, stood against these reforms. Jazani saw the failed Coup d'ètat of General Gharani as a step by America to break the stance of the Shah and also the reemergence of efforts by the National Front (Iran) (جبهه ملی ایران) that was the result of the instability of political and economic situation in Iran, resulted in forcing Amini-Arsanjani on the Shah. But Amini not only with the protection of America wanted economic, government, and social reforms; he wanted to create reforms in Iranian politics. Therefore, the Shah saw the continuation of the Amini-Arsanjani government as a hurdle in his efforts for full dictatorship and replaced them by himself and put the torch of reform in his own hands. The Shah put these reforms in place to show his unequivocal powers and at the same time by killing his political opponents the Shah increased those powers. Although political reform did not come to fruit but land reform had a damaging effect on feudalism. Land reforms impacted positively the shape of power in villages and rural areas and the political powers of the land owners decreased significantly. Jazani used this to come to the conclusion that the since the continuation of the regime is "dictatorship" therefore the ideology of the revolution in its most urgent political goal results in the overthrow of monarchy and its most needed revolutionary political goal is summed up with the slogan of "Establishment of a Republic and Democratic Government".

Because of this, even though Jazani never stroked out nonviolent struggle, but in the current circumstance came to the conclusion that open political activity is inconceivable. The government has left no possibility for this kind of activity; therefore the only method of struggle is guerrilla warfare. In the selection of this tactic Jazani and the members of the group were effected by the guerrilla warfare of South America and Vietnam and the works of Che Guevara, Fidel Castro, and Régis Debray were their main teachers. It was only Jazani and Zia-Zarifi that worked on the ideology of the group. The reaction towards secret activities and book reading resulted in the unimportance of theory in the group. Some of the members of the group were disgusted of any kind of research and made joke of it. From early 1957, the group acted to address this problem but its effects on the group remained. The change of the stance of the group resulted in the decrease of the importance of struggle in the mountains and between the villagers and increase in the importance of the struggle in the cities and the group prepared its activities according to that. But this change of tactics led to problems in the center of the group. Manoochehr Kallantari that he does not believe in the ideology of the group and Shahrzad believed that the group could not make it work. Even though after discussions they changed their positions and accepted the decision of the center of the group but in reality they were sidelined from the group's activities. Kallantari was sent to London and Shahrzad was transferred to the reserve force and in October 1967 because of disagreement with the method of stealing from the bank, after the ruling from the center of the group he was let off from the organization.

Arrest and Prison Life
In early 1968, the activities of the organization had reached a stalemate mainly due to lack of funds. The group decided to gain the required money from robbing banks. Their first attempt at this was to be on January 12, 1968, but three days prior to that date Aghayan notified the SAVAK of the group's plans. This led to the arrest of Jazani and Sourky and hiding of other members of the organization. The arrest of Shahrzad, whose location was notified to the Savak by Aghayan, led to the arrests of Izadi, Rashidi, Ahsan, Farokh Negahdar and others. In addition five other members of the group (Zarifi, Jaleel Afshar, Choopan Zadeh, Saeed Kalantari Nazari, and Keyanzad) were arrested by the SAVAK with the assistance of Abbas-Ali Shahryari and his organization.

Even though the key members of the organization had been arrested, the group was not completely destroyed. Safaii Farahani and Safari Ashtiani left Iran and joined Palestinian organization Fatah. After returning to Iran Farahani and Safari organized the Siahkal (سياهکل) uprising on February 8, 1971. Shortly after that the remaining members of the group including Hamid Ashraf and Masoud Ahmadzadeh reorganized and renamed it to Iranian People's Fadaee Guerrillas (چريك فداييان خلق ايران).

In February 1969, Jazani's group was indicted under military court. Jazani was sentenced to prison for life for participation in an organization against the monarchy and carrying an illegal weapon, which was later reduced to 15 years. The sentences for other members varied, ranging from 2 to 10 years. The group's members were located at Gasr prison until spring of 1969, when Saeed Kalantari Nazari, Sourky, Sarmady, and Choopan Zadeh attempted to escape from prison. This led to the relocation of the majority of the group members to rural areas. Jazani was sent to Qom with ordinary prisoners. Because of the respect of the prison guards towards Jazani, he was allowed to spend most of his time in the prison library studying and painting.

In this period, Jazani with the assistance of his wife gets in contact with the unknown members of the group and guides them in an ideological sense. In the summer of 1970, he wrote "What a revolutionary must know" and signs it in the name of Safaii Farahani to help Safaii strengthen his position in the group. When Siahkal occurred, through interrogation of the participants by SAVAK, they find out about the relationship of Jazani and the group. In March 1971, SAVAK brings Jazani to Tehran. From that time on, Jazani remains in Tehran and was located in between other political prisoners. In Tehran, he increases his activities in prison. Jazani had the opinion that prison is a piece of the activity outside and therefore must reflect the policies of the group. In this thought, he introduced three things to active political participants in prison: first, standing strong and holding ones place; second, contact with outside; and third development of an organization inside prison. Jazani lived his life in prison based on this. With the help of his wife and other prisoners he developed contact with the Iranian People's Fadaee Guerrillas outside of prison and created a leftist movement inside prison. This responsibility of this movement was to organize resistance, manage activities, and teaching a political and ideological to leftist prisoners and recruitment for Iranian People's Fadaee Guerrillas. The activity of Jazani caused problems from two sides in prison. The officials of SAVAK who thought of Jazani as a major problem in prison attempted to stop him from his activities. On the other side, leftist prisoners who disagreed with Jazani acted in various ways against Jazani's activities. SAVAK also created problems between these leftist factions.

The majority of those against Jazani, were the followers of Masoud Ahmadzadeh and Amir Parviz Pooyan, two of the founders of Iranian People's Fadaee Guerrillas. Although these two individuals were killed in 1972, their teachings were the official teachings of the movement up to 1976. Jazani thought these two individuals teachings were distractive and his book "Armed struggle in Iran: The Road to Mobilization of the Masses" was written in response to a book written by Ahmadzadeh "Armed struggle, Both Tactic and Strategy". Even though Jazani did not mention Parviz Pooyan or Ahmadzadeh in his book; when discussing and offering his thoughts he disapproves those offered by these two individuals. Even though there were major differences between the teachings of Jazani and Ahmadzadeh. There were two focal items that were discussed between these two schools of thoughts. These were that the revolutionary situation of the country and the method of struggle. The ones that disagreed with Jazani and approved Ahmadzadeh were under the belief that the country is in a revolutionary status and situations for a revolution exists. Therefore, a guerrilla fighter must fight with artillery to make the people aware of the revolutionary status of the country. A smaller motor, military uprising will turn a larger motor, the population; and the larger population will support the military uprising and bring down the Shah's government. In Ahmadzadeh's opinion, not believing the revolutionary situation shows a sense of individualism, which in the opinion of the leftist movement is that of a traitor.

Jazani would explain that a revolutionary status does not exist in the country and in addition to that a revolution does not result from armed struggle rather it comes about as a development of a political, social, economical, and ideological process. A military uprising should be staged at the time of- and not before the revolution, as it does not cause a revolution by itself. In his opinion, those who are for a military uprising are similar to the Shah who is blocking a peaceful means of struggle. Because of this without talking about Ahmadzadeh, Jazani wrote "When we hear that revolution begins with a military uprising, we have to say that the believers of this train of thought do not know two things: one the current situation of military uprising and second revolution in general and the revolution we want is a specific one."

The second major problem was the method of struggle. Ahmadzadeh believed that the only means of battle is a military one and had a strategic role in their fight. Jazani believed in the current situation one should not limit their means to one method but we should prepare the people in a political sense from all sides. With this effort one can fight against injustice and dictatorship for a better life for all people. This will first fix the problem with communication between people and second the social injustices develop a populous sense against the Shah in Iran and the world, and a dictator regime would fall.

Even though Jazani attempted to resolve issues through dialogue and unite the various leftist factions, his opponents dismantled the leftist movement in prison to decrease Jazani's influence. Even so, Jazani remained active to the end of his life when he was murdered alongside 8 other prisoners on April 19, 1975, by Savak. Bahman Naderipour, a SAVAK agent and closely involved with the executions, described that day's events:
We took the prisoners to the high hills above Evin. They were blind-folded and their hands were tied. We got them off the minibus and had them sit on the ground. Then, Attarpour told them that, just as your friends have killed our comrades, we have decided to execute you—the brain behind those executions. Jazani and the others began protesting. I do not know whether it was Attarpour or Colonel Vaziri who first pulled out a machine gun and started shooting them. I do not remember whether I was the 4th or 5th person to whom they gave the machine gun. I had never done that before. At the end, Sa'di Jalil Esfahani [another SAVAK agent, known as Babak] shot them in their heads [to make sure that they were dead]. 

There are suggestions of that Naderipour might have been subjected to torture after being detained by the revolutionary government, therefore the details of his narrative, which was obtained under duress, is questionable by all standards. The circumstance of Bijan Jazani's death will remain a mystery. The only truth that remains is that he was killed by execution shortly before finishing his sentence. All of Jazani's books were written in prison from 1970 to 1974. They discussed the establishment of the independent leftist movement in the two decades of the 1960s and '70s. Jazani is buried in the 33rd block of Behesht-e Zahra cemetery.

Bijan Jazani's Books in English

For more information visit: https://web.archive.org/web/20060614151405/http://fadaian-minority.org/english/home.html
More information: https://web.archive.org/web/20060614151405/http://fadaian-minority.org/english/home.html

Bijan Jazani's paintings

Notes

Further reading

External links

 Bijan Jazani Info - فارسی
 Armed Struggle; both a Strategy and a Tactic — by Massoud Ahmad-Zadeh of the IPFG

Iranian communists
1938 births
1975 deaths
Tudeh Party of Iran members
Burials at Behesht-e Zahra
Iranian revolutionaries
Organization of Iranian People's Fedai Guerrillas members
People executed by Pahlavi Iran
20th-century Iranian people
Iranian Marxists
Marxist theorists
Executed communists
Executed revolutionaries